Krissda Pornveroj (born June 1, 1977 in Bangkok, Thailand) is a Thai actor and model. He starred alongside Ann Thongprasom in the lakorn called Likit Gammatep in 2007 where he played Ann's "stepson" later husband. By 2012 he then again reunited with Ann Thongprasom in the horror/drama/romance lakorn called Qi Pao. By 2013 he was set to be in the lakorn called Wiang Roy Dao together with Nataporn Tameeruk. He is currently seen in Channel 3.

Filmography

Television

References

1977 births
Living people
Krissada Pornweroj
Krissada Pornweroj
Krissada Pornweroj
Krissada Pornweroj
Krissada Pornweroj